Timote is a settlement in Carlos Tejedor partido, Buenos Aires Province, Argentina.

Location 

It is 18 km east from Carlos Tejedor, its accesses are over 68 and 70 Provincial Roads.

Population 
According to 2010 INDEC National Census, there are 526 persons, what represents an increase of 3,3% over 509 in 2001 census.

History 
In 1876, in Foromalán lagoon shore, Conrado E. Villegas founded Capitán Timote Fort in honour to Lieutenant Colonel Pedro Timote, born in Buenos Aires in 1836 and killed in Santa Rosa battle (1874).

Pedro Eugenio Aramburu murder 

In Timote, in La Celma estate, on June 1, 1970, the body of ex-president de facto Pedro Eugenio Aramburu (1955-1958) was found, after being kidnapped and killed by the Argentine leftist urban guerrilla Montoneros.

References 

 Coord.geográficas e imágenes NASA, Google
 Timote, todo el mundo en escena
 Historia de Timote
 Timote, un pueblo que sufre el agua desde 1973

Populated places in Buenos Aires Province